Michael Rubner is an American engineer currently the TDK Professor of Polymer Materials Science and Engineering at Massachusetts Institute of Technology.

References

Year of birth missing (living people)
Living people
21st-century American engineers
Massachusetts Institute of Technology alumni
Place of birth missing (living people)